International Student Volunteers (ISV) is a voluntourism not-for-profit organization based in Yorba Linda, California. It provides educational volunteer and travel adventure programs to university students and youth internationally. ISV has offices in each host country it operates in and is also established in Australia as International Student Volunteers Pty Ltd with a head office in Sydney.

Founded in 1982 by Randy Sykes under the name ‘Youth in Action’, ISV has been offering volunteer and adventure programs since 2002. Since then over 30,000 students have traveled with ISV and contributed nearly three million hours of volunteer service to projects in Australia, New Zealand, Costa Rica, The Dominican Republic, Romania, Croatia, Bosnia, the United States, Thailand, Ecuador and South Africa. It has been selected as one of the top ten volunteer organizations in the world by the International Voluntary Service Task Force, part of the US Center for Citizen Diplomacy.
In 2011, ISV also received the award for 'Outstanding Project of the Year' by the World Youth Student and Travel Confederation (WYSTC) in Barcelona for its San Juanillo Sustainable Development project in Costa Rica. In 2013, it made the top three for the Happy Feet Children's Development project in South Africa, and was runner up in 2014 for Blue Moon, a Community Development and Children's Health Education Program in the Dominican Republic.

Most of ISV’s participants are university students in the USA, Canada, the UK, Australia and New Zealand. The ISV program is open to all individuals 18 and over (i.e. not limited to students), is offered during the summer months (both Northern and Southern Hemisphere summers), and is composed of a two or four week program in selected countries. ISV also offers 3-week high school programs for students aged between 15 and 18 in Costa Rica, Thailand, The Dominican Republic and New Zealand.

The program

Volunteer project
Participants spend their first two weeks in groups of approximately, 10 plus a qualified ISV Project Leader, doing hands-on volunteer activities directly with selected partner host organizations. These are generally small, grass-roots organizations working to improve their local environment and/or the lives of the local community members. Some of the more internationally recognized host organizations that ISV works with include: Habitat for Humanity, Conservation International and Conservation Volunteers Australia. ISV also runs several of its own grassroots volunteer projects internationally. ISV carefully assesses each project that they choose for safety and sustainability, among other areas.

Projects may be conservation, humanitarian (social community development) or a mixture of both. Past projects have included children’s education programs, bush land regeneration, sea turtle conservation, working at an Elephant Nature Park, teaching English, house building projects, sustainable development and education projects and wildlife surveys and data collection.  International Student Volunteers forms long-term relationships with many of the host organizations, such as with the Wild Mountains Trust, a non-profit organization in Australia focused on environmental education where ISV volunteers have been working for 10 years.

Adventure Tour
The second component of the program consists of two weeks of travel, exploration, discovery and adventure in the host country. Tour group sizes are generally larger, bringing together multiple project groups to meet and interact on the tour component. The tour is run and operated by ISV with an ISV Tour Leader. Participants travel throughout their host country and learn about the environment and culture of the country, while they take part in activities such as white water rafting, city tours, horseback riding, snorkeling, glacier treks, waterfall rappelling, cultural shows, etc.

Academic credit
As of 2015, 150 universities have offered academic credit through independent study to ISV participants. In addition to the option of independent study, since 2002 various universities within the USA, UK and Australia have offered academic credit in accordance with an ISV Program Syllabus which has been approved by the accrediting institutions. The educational focus is in the area of Natural Resource Management and Sustainable Development, capitalising on the program's opportunities for experiential education in an international volunteer setting.

However, it is an educational program for all participants regardless of whether or not they are earning credit. The program incorporates group discussions, daily journaling, guest speakers and more, to facilitate and encourage participants to gain as much as possible from their experience.

Other points of interest
Currently, ISV offers programs in Australia, New Zealand, Costa Rica, Dominican Republic, South Africa, and Thailand.

ISV is committed to developing active global citizens who embrace a lifestyle of volunteering, and offers the 'Global Volunteer Citizens Award' to those who complete an additional 20 hours of volunteering in their own community when they return home from an ISV Program. Similarly, participants in the USA may receive the President's Volunteer Service Award when completing an additional 20 hours of volunteering in their community.

Because ISV is a California-based non-profit public benefit corporation 501(c), students residing in the USA may also raise funds for the program thorough tax deductible sponsorship donations. ISV is registered as a non-profit organization with the IRS in Yorba Linda, California.  This is also where their United States office is located.  As of March 2011, International Student Volunteers holds a Better Business Bureau rating of 'A−' and has been accredited on their website since 1998.

ISV appears as a resource in the Lonely Planet: Costa Rica guide book. ISV is also discussed in a book that investigates the growing industry of volunteer travel.

See also
Volunteer travel

References

External links
 

Non-profit organizations based in California
Youth organizations based in California
Student organizations established in 1982
1982 establishments in California